Marie Hourihan (born 10 March 1989) is a retired Irish footballer and coach who is currently manager of London Bees. She previously played for clubs including Chelsea, Birmingham City and Manchester City W.F.C. She represented the Republic of Ireland at senior international level, having represented England up to under-23 level.

Club career

Birmingham City, 2011–2013 
Hourihan's debut for Birmingham City was a 4–0 shutout win against Bristol City on 14 April 2011. She made 11 appearances for the club during the 2011 FA WSL season helping the team finish in second place with a  record.

During the 2012 FA WSL season, she made seven appearances to help the team finish in second place with a  record.

Chelsea, 2013–2015 
In July 2013, Hourihan signed with Chelsea L.F.C. for the 2013 FA WSL season.

Manchester City, 2016–2018
In December 2015, Hourihan signed with Manchester City for the 2016 FA WSL season.

Brighton, 2018–2019
Hourihan joined Brighton & Hove Albion W.F.C. in January 2018, on a loan deal until the end of the season. The move was made permanent in the summer of 2018.

Braga, 2019–2021
In July 2019 Hourihan signed for Portuguese Campeonato Nacional de Futebol Feminino champions Braga.

International career
After previously representing the England women's national under-23 football team, Hourihan accepted a call-up from the new Republic of Ireland women's national football team coach Colin Bell in 2017. She was eligible to represent the Girls in Green thanks to her late grandmother who moved back from London to her native Arigna, County Roscommon. She made her senior debut in March 2017, in a 0–0 draw with Hungary at the 2017 Cyprus Cup. Hourihan was installed as the successor to Ireland's longstanding goalkeeper Emma Byrne.

Personal life
Hourihan is a second cousin of the footballer Conor Hourihane.

Honours 
Birmingham City
 Women's FA Cup: 2011–12

Chelsea
 FA WSL 1 Winner: 2015
 Women's FA Cup: 2014–15
 FA WSL 1 Runner-up:  2012,  2014

Manchester City
 FA WSL Cup: 2016
 Women's FA Cup: 2016–17

See also

References

Further reading
 Caudwell, Jayne (2011), Women's Football in the UK: Continuing with Gender Analyses, Routledge, 
 Grainey, Timothy (2012), Beyond Bend It Like Beckham: The Global Phenomenon of Women's Soccer, University of Nebraska Press, 
 Scraton, S., Magee, J., Caudwell, J. (2008), Women, Football and Europe: Histories, Equity and Experience (Ifi) (Vol 1), Meyer & Meyer Fachverlag und Buchhandel GmbH, 
 Stewart, Barbara (2012), Women's Soccer: The Passionate Game, Greystone Books, 
 Williams, Jean (2003), A Game for Rough Girls?: A History of Women's Football in Britain, Routledge,

External links
 
 Brighton & Hove Albion player profile 
 SC Braga player profile 
 

Living people
English women's footballers
Women's association football goalkeepers
1987 births
Women's Super League players
England women's under-23 international footballers
Manchester City W.F.C. players
Leicester City W.F.C. players
Watford F.C. Women players
Fulham L.F.C. players
Republic of Ireland women's international footballers
Republic of Ireland women's association footballers
Doncaster Rovers Belles L.F.C. players
Brighton & Hove Albion W.F.C. players
Spartans W.F.C. players
Scottish Women's Premier League players
S.C. Braga (women's football) players
Expatriate women's footballers in Portugal
Irish expatriate association footballers
Irish expatriate sportspeople in Portugal
Campeonato Nacional de Futebol Feminino players